Corticariinae is a subfamily of beetles in the family Latridiidae, containing the following genera:

 Austrophthalma Dajoz, 1966
 Bicava Belon, 1884
 Corticaria Marsham, 1802
 Corticarina Reitter, 1881
 Corticaromus Tarun K. Pal & Shelley Ghosh, 2008
 Cortinicara Johnson, 1975
 Fuchsina Fall, 1899
 Melanophthalma Motschulsky, 1866
 Migneauxia Jacquelin du Val, 1859
 Paracaria Dajoz, 1970
 Rethusus Broun, 1886

References

Polyphaga subfamilies
Latridiidae